The 1911 Philadelphia Athletics season was a season in American baseball. The A's finished first in the American League with a record of 101 wins and 50 losses, then went on to defeat the New York Giants in the 1911 World Series, four games to two, for their second straight World Championship.

Starting in 1911, the team was known for its "$100,000 infield", consisting of John "Stuffy" McInnis (first base), Eddie Collins (second base), Jack Barry (shortstop), and Frank "Home Run" Baker (third base) as well as pitchers Eddie Plank and Charles "Chief" Bender.

Regular season

Season standings

Record vs. opponents

Roster

Player stats

Batting

Starters by position 
Note: Pos = Position; G = Games played; AB = At bats; H = Hits; Avg. = Batting average; HR = Home runs; RBI = Runs batted in

Other batters 
Note: G = Games played; AB = At bats; H = Hits; Avg. = Batting average; HR = Home runs; RBI = Runs batted in

Pitching

Starting pitchers 
Note: G = Games pitched; IP = Innings pitched; W = Wins; L = Losses; ERA = Earned run average; SO = Strikeouts

Other pitchers 
Note: G = Games pitched; IP = Innings pitched; W = Wins; L = Losses; ERA = Earned run average; SO = Strikeouts

Relief pitchers 
Note: G = Games pitched; W = Wins; L = Losses; SV = Saves; ERA = Earned run average; SO = Strikeouts

1911 World Series 

AL Philadelphia Athletics (4) vs. NL New York Giants (2)

References

External links

1911 Philadelphia Athletics team page at Baseball Reference
1911 Philadelphia Athletics team page at www.baseball-almanac.com

Oakland Athletics seasons
Philadelphia Athletics season
American League champion seasons
World Series champion seasons
Oakland